Kenneth Roy Crook CMG (30 July 1920 – 24 July 2012) was a British diplomat.
 
He was Governor of the Cayman Islands from 1971 to 1974, and Ambassador to Afghanistan from 1976 to 1979.

He was named Companion of the Order of St Michael and St George (CMG) in 1977.

References

1920 births
2012 deaths
Governors of the Cayman Islands
Ambassadors of the United Kingdom to Afghanistan
Companions of the Order of St Michael and St George